The Catalina 250 is an American trailerable sailboat, that was designed by the Catalina Design Team and first built in 1995.

Production
The boat was built by Catalina Yachts in the United States starting in 1995, but it is now out of production.

Design

The Catalina 250 is a small recreational keelboat, built predominantly of fiberglass. It has a masthead sloop rig, a transom-hung rudder and a fixed fin keel, wing keel or centerboard. The fin keel version displaces  and carries  of ballast. The centerboard version displaces  and also carries  of water ballast in a separate double bottom hull tank.

The boat is normally fitted with a small outboard motor for docking and maneuvering.

The design has sleeping accommodation for four people, with a double "V"-berth in the bow cabin and two straight settees in the main cabin with a lowering table. The galley is located on the starboard side at the companionway ladder. The galley is equipped with a stove, ice box and a sink. The head is located opposite the galley on the port side and includes a sink.

The wing keel version has a PHRF racing average handicap of 228 with a high of 237 and low of 213. The centerboard and water ballast version has a PHRF racing average handicap of 222 with a high of 228 and low of 216.

Operational history
In a 2010 review Steve Henkel wrote, "best features: the wing keel model comes close to being an ideal combination of features and economy for new sailors just starting out and wanting to test the waters. Worst features: The water ballast version has some inherent weaknesses, for example, water is only one eleventh the density of lead, limiting its effectiveness as ballast; since shallow draft is paramount for easy ramp launching, the ballast cannot be as deep as with conventional lead ballast; and to attain enough total weight to be even partially effective, it must be spread out into the ends of the hull, which tends to slow the boat in waves. The bottom line is that water ballast makes for a slower, more tender boat compared to an identical design with a lead keel."

See also

List of sailing boat types

Similar sailboats
Beachcomber 25
Bayfield 25
Beneteau First 25.7
Beneteau First 25S
Beneteau First 260 Spirit
Bombardier 7.6
Catalina 25
C&C 25
Cal 25
Cal 2-25
Capri 25
Com-Pac 25
Dufour 1800
Freedom 25
Hunter 25.5
Jouët 760
Kirby 25
Kelt 7.6
O'Day 25
MacGregor 25
Merit 25
Mirage 25
Northern 25
Redline 25
US Yachts US 25
Watkins 25

References

External links

Keelboats
1990s sailboat type designs
Sailing yachts
Trailer sailers
Sailboat type designs by Catalina Design Team
Sailboat types built by Catalina Yachts